Eilema arizona is a moth of the  subfamily Arctiinae. It is found in Taiwan.

References

arizona